Megumi Sasaki (佐々木 芽生 Sasaki Megumi, born 1962) is a Japanese filmmaker and writer. Her films include Herb and Dorothy, Herb & Dorothy 50x50, and A Whale of a Tale.

Early life 
Born in Sapporo, she moved to New York City in 1987 and later worked for NHK as a reporter.

Filmmaking career 
Sasaki's 2008 film Herb & Dorothy followed art collectors Herbert and Dorothy Vogel to document how they chose artwork for their collection. Five years later Sasaki released Herb & Dorothy 50x50, which tracked the progress of the Vogels' efforts to donate fifty pieces from their collection to each of the fifty US states, but which the Los Angeles Times called "less personal than the earlier documentary".

Sasaki's 2018 film A Whale of a Tale is a documentary about the Taiji dolphin drive hunt. It was created as a response to The Cove and includes perspectives from Japanese fishermen as well as activists. Sasaki claims that she decided to make the film when she saw The Cove win an Academy Award. The New York Times called the A Whale of a Tale "a rambling blend of complaint, tourism and straw-men arguments" while The Hollywood Reporter praised it for delivering "a thoughtful riposte to The Cove even while providing plenty of opportunity for those opposed to the practice of killing or capturing whales and dolphins to make their case". A nonfiction book by Sasaki with the same title as the film was published by Shueisha in 2017.

Filmography

Bibliography 
, 2017, Shueisha,

References 

Living people
21st-century Japanese women writers
Japanese journalists
Japanese women film directors
People from Sapporo
1962 births
Japanese emigrants to the United States